Jess Lockwood may refer to:
 Jess Lockwood (Home and Away), a character from the Australian soap opera Home and Away
 Jess Lockwood (bull rider) (born 1997), professional bull rider